Sinsini is a village in Bharatpur district in Rajasthan, India, situated 20 km to the south from Deeg.

References

External links
Imperial Gazetteer of India, v. 8, Bharatpur State

History of Rajasthan
Villages in Bharatpur district